Bjørn Boom (born 17 December 1975) is a Dutch water polo player. He competed in the men's tournament at the 2000 Summer Olympics.

See also
 Netherlands men's Olympic water polo team records and statistics

References

External links
 

1975 births
Living people
Dutch male water polo players
Olympic water polo players of the Netherlands
Water polo players at the 2000 Summer Olympics
Water polo players from Amsterdam